12 oz. Mouse is an American surreal humour and psychological thriller animated television series created by Matt Maiellaro for Cartoon Network's late-night programming block, Adult Swim. The series revolves around Mouse Fitzgerald, nicknamed "Fitz" (voiced by Maiellaro), an alcoholic mouse who performs odd jobs so he can buy more beer. Together with his chinchilla companion Skillet, Fitz begins to recover suppressed memories that he once had a wife and a child who have now vanished. This leads him to seek answers about his past and the shadowy forces that seem to be manipulating his world.

The pilot first aired as a special presentation on June 19, 2005, and the series later started officially airing from October 23, 2005 until ending on December 17, 2006, with a total of 20 episodes over the course of 2 seasons. A special, entitled "Spider-Man Special", aired on November 6, 2005 and a stand-alone webisode, entitled "Enter the Sandmouse", was later released online on May 16, 2007. 

In 2018 a double-length special, entitled "Invictus", aired on October 14th and it was announced that 12 oz. Mouse had also been revived as a series. The final episode of the third season originally aired unannounced on April 1, 2020, as part of Adult Swim's annual April Fools Day stunt. The first 10 episodes from the third season premiered nightly (except weekends) from July 20 to July 31, 2020.

Series overview

Episodes

Season 1 (2005–06)

Spider-Man Special (2005)

Season 2 (2006)

Webisode (2007)

"Invictus" (2018)

Season 3 (2020)

New Years Marathon (2005)
A marathon aired on the night of New Year's Eve 2005 on Adult Swim, consisting of the first six episodes of season 1, and concluding with then unfinished season finale, "Adventure Mouse."

The bumps aired during the marathon featured new scenes, such as:
Fitz and Skillet surfing.
Fitz and Skillet shooting at a skeleton.
 Fitz & Skillet continue shooting at the skeleton to pieces.
Peanut Cop getting blown up by a bomb at Rhoda's Bar.
Peanut Cop gets blown up on streets by another bomb.
Peanut Cop in a crudely drawn Jail Cell gets blown up by a bomb.
Green Sweater Woman talking to Liquor in his liquor store.
Green Sweater Woman complaining  to the Producer Man with flowers.
Eye tap dancing on an island.
In "Eighteen", Eye claims that this 'eyeland' is his home.
Fitz playing his guitar at the Music Void.
Golden Joe reading an excerpt from The Great Gatsby.

See also
 12 oz. Mouse

References

External links
 
 

Lists of American adult animated television series episodes
Lists of American espionage television series episodes